"I Hate Mondays" is a song by English singer-songwriter and musician Newton Faulkner. The song was released on 16 July 2010 in Australia. The song peaked at number 8 on the Australian Singles Chart. The lyrics to the song were written by Michael "Horgs" Horgan for the Hamish & Andy Show; specifically, the lyrics were made for a segment of the show called "Horgs' Inventions", where Horgs noted that there hadn't been any songs about hating Mondays in a long time. Harry Connick Jr also performed a version of the song, but his version was not officially released as a single.

Track listing
Digital download
 "I Hate Mondays" - 4:02

Chart performance

Release history

References

2010 singles
Newton Faulkner songs
2009 songs